Brent Larkham (born 8 January 1972) is a former professional tennis player from Australia. He is the elder brother of Todd Larkham, who also played professional tennis.

Career
Larkham had the best performance of his career at the 1994 Australian Open, where he made a surprise run to the third round, as a wildcard. He won his opening match against Japanese qualifier Ryuso Tsujino in straight sets and also didn't drop a set in his second round meeting with 27th ranked Amos Mansdorf. In the third round he played Martin Damm but couldn't beat the Czech, losing in four sets.

Also in 1994, Larkham made the second round of the Stella Artois Championships (Queen's), with a win over Patrick McEnroe, who was then ranked 66 in the world. He was then eliminated by Stefan Edberg.

After retiring, due to a back injury, Larkham spent some time coaching his brother Todd and has also worked with Wayne Arthurs, Richard Fromberg and Paul Hanley. He is now head coach of the tennis program at the Australian Institute of Sports in Canberra.

Challenger titles

Singles: (2)

Doubles: (3)

References

External links 
 
 
 

1972 births
Living people
Australian male tennis players
Australian tennis coaches
Tennis people from the Australian Capital Territory